The Latin Grammy Award for Best Folk Album is an honor presented annually at the Latin Grammy Awards, a ceremony that recognizes excellence and creates a wider awareness of cultural diversity and contributions of Latin recording artists in the United States and internationally.  
The award goes to solo artists, duos, or groups for releasing vocal or instrumental albums containing at least 51% of new recordings.

The award was first presented to Argentine singer Mercedes Sosa for the album Misa Criolla at the 1st Latin Grammy Awards ceremony in 2000. She also happens to be the most nominated and awarded performer in this category with five accolades. Her album Cantora 1 became the first folk album to be nominated for Album of the Year in 2009 but lost to Calle 13's Los de atrás vienen conmigo. In 2011 she became the first artist to receive this award posthumously for the album Deja La Vida Volar.

On the other hand, Peruvian singer Eva Ayllón holds the record for most nominations without a win with ten. Musicians originating from Argentina and Colombia have received this award more times than any other nationality winning on four and two occasions respectively.

Winners and nominees

2000s

2010s

2020s

 Each year is linked to the article about the Latin Grammy Awards held that year.

See also
Latin Grammy Award for Best Tango Album
Latin Grammy Award for Best Flamenco Album

References

General
  Note: User must select the "Traditional Field" category as the genre under the search feature.

Specific

External links
Official site of the Latin Grammy Awards

Folk Album
Folk music awards